The Polish Open is the oldest and most prestigious professional golf tournament in Poland. First played in 1994, from 1996 to 1999 it was included on the Challenge Tour, and subsequently on the Pro Golf Tour (formerly known as the EPD Tour).

In its capacity as a national open golf championship, starting with 1994 champion Gary Marks the winner earned qualification to the Sarazen World Open, an unofficial money event on the PGA Tour 1994–1999 featuring national open winners.

Winners

Notes

References

External links
Coverage on the Challenge Tour's official site

Former Challenge Tour events
Golf tournaments in Poland
Golf Open
Recurring sporting events established in 1994
1994 establishments in Poland